Jorge Luis Mateo (born June 23, 1995) is a Dominican professional baseball shortstop and outfielder for the Baltimore Orioles of Major League Baseball (MLB). He made his MLB debut in 2020 for the San Diego Padres.

Career

New York Yankees
Mateo signed with the New York Yankees as an international free agent in January 2012, receiving a $250,000 signing bonus. He made his professional debut that season for the Dominican Summer League Yankees 2 and batted .255 with one home run and eight RBIs in 14 games. He played for the Dominican Summer League Yankees 1 in 2013, compiling a .287 batting average with seven home runs and 26 RBIs in 64 games, and the Gulf Coast Yankees in 2014, slashing .276/.354/.397 in 15 games. In 2015, while playing for the Charleston RiverDogs and the Tampa Yankees, Mateo posted a combined .278 batting average with two home runs, 11 triples, 40 RBIs, and 82 stolen bases in 117 total games between both clubs.

Mateo was ranked by Baseball America as the top Yankees minor league prospect ahead of Gary Sánchez and Aaron Judge prior to the 2016 campaign. He also received a non-roster invitation to spring training. He spent the season back with Tampa, and was named to appear in the All-Star Futures Game. However, on July 6, 2016, Mateo was suspended for two weeks due to violating the team's code of conduct policy, and could not participate in the Futures Game. Mateo finished 2016 with a .254 batting average, eight home runs, 36 stolen bases, and 47 RBIs. The Yankees added him to their 40-man roster after the season. He began 2017 with Tampa and was promoted to the Trenton Thunder in late June.

Oakland Athletics
On July 31, 2017, the Yankees traded Mateo, along with Dustin Fowler and James Kaprielian to the Oakland Athletics, in exchange for Sonny Gray. Oakland assigned him to the Midland RockHounds and he finished the season there. In 129 total games between Tampa, Trenton and Midland, he batted .267 in 532 at bats with 12 home runs, 18 triples, 57 RBIs, and 52 stolen bases.

In April 2018, Baseball America named Mateo as having the best speed of all minor league players, ahead of Phillies outfielder Roman Quinn. That season, playing for the AAA Nashville Sounds he hit .230/.280/.353 in 470 at bats with 3 home runs, 16 triples, 45 RBIs, and 25 stolen bases while being caught 10 times. 

Mateo opened the 2019 season with the Las Vegas Aviators. Mateo was named to the 2019 All-Star Futures Game. In 2019 he led the minor league in triples, with 14.

San Diego Padres
On June 30, 2020, the Athletics traded Mateo to the San Diego Padres in exchange for Junior Perez. He was activated and started his first career game as the left fielder on August 13. On August 27, in the second game of a doubleheaders against the Seattle Mariners, Mateo recorded his first MLB hit on a ground rule double. He hit his first major league home run on April 29, 2021, against the Arizona Diamondbacks. On August 3, 2021, Mateo was designated for assignment by the Padres.

Baltimore Orioles
On August 5, 2021, Mateo was claimed off of waivers by the Baltimore Orioles. In 2021, he batted .247/.293/.376 with 4 home runs, 14 RBIs and 10 stolen bases in 89 games between the Padres and Orioles.

In the 2022 season, Mateo started on the Orioles opening day roster at shortstop and finished the season batting .221/.267/.379 with 13 home runs, 50 RBIs, and 35 stolen bases in 494 at-bats. He led the major leagues with the most stolen bases in the regular season of 2022, trailed by teammate Cedric Mullins by one.  Mateo won the Fielding Bible Award as the best defensive shortstop in MLB for the 2022 season, making him the first Oriole to win the award at that position. 

On January 13, 2023, Mateo agreed to a one-year, $2 million contract with the Orioles, avoiding salary arbitration.

References

External links

1995 births
Living people
American League stolen base champions
Baltimore Orioles players
Charleston RiverDogs players
Dominican Republic expatriate baseball players in the United States
Dominican Summer League Yankees players
Gulf Coast Yankees players
Major League Baseball infielders
Major League Baseball outfielders
Major League Baseball players from the Dominican Republic
Midland RockHounds players
San Diego Padres players
Tampa Yankees players
Toros del Este players
Trenton Thunder players
Nashville Sounds players
Las Vegas Aviators players
Sportspeople from Santo Domingo